The Isle of Man Cricket Association is the official ICC recognised organisation chosen to represent Isle of Man in cricket matters. In 2017, became an associate member

References

External links
 Isle of Man Cricket

Isle of Man
Administration